Man Against Man may refer to:
 Man Against Man (1928 film), a German silent thriller film
 Man Against Man (1924 film), a German silent drama film

See also
 Mann gegen Mann, a song by  Rammstein